TJ Ioane (9 May 1989 in Samoa) is a Samoa international rugby union player. He plays as a flanker for Glasgow Warriors in the Pro14 on loan from Premiership Rugby side London Irish.

Rugby Union career

Amateur career

Ioane moved from Samoa to New Zealand at 8 years old.

He first played for Wellington College and then the Old Boys University side.

Professional career

He had two seasons with the Highlanders in New Zealand from 2013, before he moved to the northern hemisphere.

Ioane was signed by Sale Sharks in the summer of 2015.

After three seasons with Sale, he was released by the club and picked up by London Irish in 2018.

In October 2020, after two seasons with London Irish it was confirmed that Ioane would join Pro14 side Glasgow Warriors on loan. He made his competitive debut for the club against Ospreys at the Liberty Stadium on 24 October 2020. He became Glasgow Warrior No. 316. In Glasgow's final league match against Benetton Treviso in the 2020-21 Pro14 season, Ioane won the Player of the Match award.

International career

In 2014 he was named in Samoa national team's squad for their 2014 European tour. He debuted in Samoa's second tour match, starting at #7 against Canada.

He has represented Samoa at the 2015 and 2019 Rugby World Cups. He is known for his high work rate. Domestically, he represented Otago in the ITM Cup. He made his provincial debut in 2009 and his strong performances saw him named in the  squad for the 2013 Super Rugby season. He has international experience as well with the New Zealand schools side in 2007.

References

External links
itsrugby.co.uk profile

1989 births
Living people
Otago rugby union players
Highlanders (rugby union) players
Sale Sharks players
Rugby union flankers
Rugby union number eights
Samoan rugby union players
New Zealand expatriate sportspeople in England
Samoan emigrants to New Zealand
People educated at Wellington College (New Zealand)
Samoa international rugby union players
Glasgow Warriors players
Union Sportive Bressane players
London Irish players
Wellington rugby union players